The 2017–18 season was Gillingham's 125th season in their existence and fifth consecutive season in League One. Along with League One, the club participated in the FA Cup, EFL Cup and EFL Trophy.
The season covers the period from 1 July 2017 to 30 June 2018.

Transfers

Transfers in

Transfers out

Loans in

Loans out

Competitions

Friendlies
As of 27 June 2017, Gillingham have announced nine pre-season friendlies against Faversham Town, Dartford, Dover Athletic, Chatham Town, Ipswich Town, Patro Eisden, Colchester United and Canvey Island

League One

League table

Results summary

Matches
On 21 June 2017, the league fixtures were announced.

FA Cup
On 16 October 2017, Gillingham were drawn at home against Dagenham & Redbridge or Leyton Orient in the first round. Another home fixture was confirmed for the second round with Carlisle United the visitors.

EFL Cup
On 16 June 2017, Gillingham were drawn away to Reading in the first round.

EFL Trophy

Squad statistics
Source:

Numbers in parentheses denote appearances as substitute.
Players with squad numbers struck through and marked  left the club during the playing season.
Players with names in italics and marked * were on loan from another club for the whole of their season with Gillingham.
Players listed with no appearances have been in the matchday squad but only as unused substitutes.
Key to positions: GK – Goalkeeper; DF – Defender; MF – Midfielder; FW – Forward

References

Gillingham F.C. seasons
Gillingham